John Slidell (1793July 9, 1871) was an American politician, lawyer, and businessman. A native of New York, Slidell moved to Louisiana as a young man and became a Representative and Senator. He was one of two Confederate diplomats captured by the United States Navy from the British ship RMS Trent in 1861 and later released. He was the older brother of Alexander Slidell Mackenzie, a US naval officer.

Early life
He was born to merchant John Slidell and Margery née Mackenzie, a Scot. He graduated from Columbia University (then College)  1810. In 1835, Slidell married Mathilde Deslonde. They had three children, Alfred Slidell, Marie Rosine (later [on 30 Sept. 1872] comtesse [Countess] de St. Roman), and Marguerite Mathilde (later [on 3 Oct. 1864] baronne [Baroness] Frederic Emile d'Erlanger).

Political career
Prior to the Mexican–American War, Slidell was sent to Mexico, by President James Knox Polk, to negotiate an agreement whereby the Rio Grande would be the southern border of Texas. He also was instructed to offer, among other alternatives, a maximum of $25 million for California by Polk and his administration. Slidell warned Polk that the Mexican reluctance to negotiate a peaceful solution might require a show of military force to defend the border by the United States. Under the command of General Zachary Taylor, U.S. troops were sent into the disputed area between the Rio Grande and Nueces Rivers. The Mexican government, in a state of chaos at the time, rejected Slidell's mission. After Mexican forces repelled a U.S. scouting expedition, the United States declared war on Mexico on May 13, 1846.

Slidell was elected to the Senate in 1853 and cast his lot with other pro-Southern congressmen to repeal the Missouri Compromise, acquire Cuba, and admit Kansas as a slave state. In the 1860 campaign Slidell supported Democratic presidential candidate John C. Breckinridge, but remained a pro-Union moderate until Abraham Lincoln's election resulted in the Southern states seceding. At the Democratic National Convention in Charleston, South Carolina, in April 1860, Slidell plotted with "Fire-Eaters" such as  William Lowndes Yancey of Alabama to stymie the nomination of the popular Northern Democratic Senator Stephen A. Douglas of Illinois.

Civil War

Slidell soon accepted a diplomatic appointment to represent the Confederacy in France. Slidell was one of the two Confederate diplomats involved in the Trent Affair in November 1861. After he was appointed the Confederate commissioner to France in September, 1861, he ran the blockade from Charleston, South Carolina, with James Murray Mason of Virginia. They then set sail from Havana on the British mail boat steamer RMS Trent but were intercepted by the US Navy while en route and taken into captivity at Fort Warren in Boston.

The Northern public erupted with a huge display of triumphalism at this dramatic capture. Even the cool-headed Lincoln was swept along in the celebratory spirit, but when he and his cabinet studied the likely consequences of a war with Britain, their enthusiasm waned. After some careful diplomatic exchanges, they admitted that the capture had been conducted contrary to maritime law
and that private citizens could not be classified as "enemy despatches." Slidell and Mason were released, and war was averted.

After the resolution of the Trent Affair, the two diplomats set sail for England on January 1, 1862. From England, Slidell at once went to Paris, where, in February 1862, he paid his first visit to the French minister of foreign affairs. His mission to gain recognition of the Confederate States by France failed, as did his effort to negotiate a commercial agreement
for France to get control of Southern cotton if the blockade were broken. In both cases, France refused to move without the co-operation of England. He succeeded in negotiating a loan of $15,000,000 from Emile Erlanger & Co. and in securing the ship "Stonewall" for the Confederate government.

Later life
Slidell moved to Paris, France, after the Civil War. He died in Cowes, Isle of Wight, England, at age 78. He is interred in the Saint-Roman family private cemetery near Paris. He, Judah P. Benjamin and A. Dudley Mann were among the high-ranking Confederate officials buried abroad.

Family
Slidell was a brother of Alexander Slidell Mackenzie, a naval officer who commanded the USS Somers on which a unique event occurred in 1842 off the coast of Africa during the Blockade of Africa. Three crewmen were hanged after being convicted of mutiny at sea. Mackenzie reversed the order of his middle and last names to honor a maternal uncle.

Another brother, Thomas Slidell, was chief justice of the Louisiana Supreme Court. He was also the brother-in-law of the American naval Commodore Matthew C. Perry, who was married to Slidell's sister, Jane.

Legacy
The city of Slidell in St. Tammany Parish, Louisiana, was named in his honor by his son-in-law Baron Frederic Emile d'Erlanger; the village of Slidell, Texas, is also named after him.

References

"John Slidell", A Dictionary of Louisiana Biography, Vol. 2 (1988), pp. 746–747
John Slidell (1793 - 1871), civilwarhome.com

Sources
 Case, Lynn M., and Warren E. Spencer. The United States and France: Civil War Diplomacy (1970) online
 Sears, Louis Martin. "A Confederate Diplomat at the Court of Napoleon III," American Historical Review (1921) 26#2  pp. 255–281 in JSTOR on Slidell
 Sears, Louis Martin. John Slidell, Duke University Press (1925).
 Sainlaude, Stève. France and the American Civil War: A Diplomatic History (UNC Press, 2019).

External links

 
 
 John Slidell in the Louisiana Historical Association's Dictionary of Louisiana Biography
 

1793 births
1871 deaths
Democratic Party members of the Louisiana House of Representatives
United States Attorneys for the Eastern District of Louisiana
New York (state) lawyers
American merchants
19th-century American diplomats
Confederate States of America diplomats
Columbia College (New York) alumni
Politicians from New Orleans
People of Louisiana in the American Civil War
Democratic Party United States senators from Louisiana
Democratic Party members of the United States House of Representatives from Louisiana
Lawyers from New Orleans
Businesspeople from New Orleans
Ambassadors of the United States to Mexico
Confederate expatriates
American expatriates in France
19th-century American businesspeople
19th-century American lawyers